Pakin (or francicized Pakine) (in Armenian Բագին meaning altar in Armenian, full name at establishment Բագին, Ամսագիր Գրականութեան եւ Արուեստի, i.e. Pakin, Amsakir Kraganutyan yev Arvesdi, meaning Pakin, Literary and Cultural Monthly) is an Armenian language literary and cultural periodical published in Beirut, Lebanon since 1962. The magazine was founded with Garo Sassouni as executive editor, and editors were Yetvart Boyajian and Boghos Snabian. Pakin publishes works mainly of Armenian diaspora writers in addition to some writings from Armenia, in addition to a section of reports on culture, newly published works in Armenian or other languages, literary criticism.

Pakin is published with various frequencies, as monthly, bi-monthly and presently quarterly. It is considered one of the main literary publications in Western Armenian. Its longest-running editor in chief was writer Boghos Snabian from 1964 to 2003 when writer Hagop Balian took over the responsibility. A number of writers, have contributed including Haroutioun Keghart, Dikran Vosgouni, Papken Papazian, and Vahe Oshagan.  The magazine is also renowned for its series of special issues dedicated to certain writers or events.

References

External links
Pakin download site: http://www.hamazkayin.com/pakin-am/?cat=all-issues
Pakin Archive (1962-present) 
Pakin 50th anniversary issue (October, November, December 2012)

1962 establishments in Lebanon
Armenian-language mass media in Lebanon
Armenian-language magazines
Cultural magazines
Magazines established in 1962
Magazines published in Beirut
Monthly magazines published in Lebanon